Karjaküla is a village in Türi Parish, Järva County in central Estonia.

Harald Nugiseks (1921–2014), a former SS officer in the World War II, was born in Vanaõue farmstead in Karjaküla.

References

Villages in Järva County